The Hypotiini are a tribe of moths of the family Pyralidae. It was described by Thomas Algernon Chapman in 1902

Genera
Arsenaria Ragonot, 1891
Hypotia Zeller, 1847

References

 
Moth tribes